The 1959–60 Liga Bet season saw Hapoel HaMechonit,  Hapoel Herzliya, Hapoel Lod and Maccabi Sha'arayim win their regional divisions, and qualify for promotion play-offs. Hapoel Herzliya and Maccabi Sha'arayim won the promotion play-offs and promoted to Liga Alef.

North Division A

Maccabi Tiberias withdrew from the league during the season and their results were nullified.

North Division B

South Division A

South Division B

Promotion play-offs
A promotion play-off was played between the two winners of the North divisions, and another promotion play-off was played between the two winners of the South divisions. the play-offs format was of two legs, with a decisive match played in neutral venue, if two teams are level. the play-off winners set to be promoted to Liga Alef.

North play-off

Hapoel Herzliya promoted to Liga Alef.

South play-off

Maccabi Sha'arayim promoted to Liga Alef.

References
Liga Bet tables (Page 4) Hadshot HaSport, 7.6.60, archive.football.co.il 
Saturday in Bet leagues (Page 4) Hadshot HaSport, 3.5.60, archive.football.co.il 
Saturday in Bet leagues (Page 4) Hadshot HaSport, 22.5.60, archive.football.co.il 
Saturday in Bet leagues (Page 1) Hadshot HaSport, 29.5.60, archive.football.co.il 
Saturday in Bet leagues (Page 4) Hadshot HaSport, 5.6.60, archive.football.co.il 
Holiday results, Saturday results (Page 4) Hadshot HaSport, 6.6.60, archive.football.co.il 
Liga Bet in football, In the Liga Bet play-offs (Page 3) Hadshot HaSport, 12.6.60, archive.football.co.il 
Liga Bet, Lod won by one goal (Page 4) Hadshot HaSport, 19.6.60, archive.football.co.il 
Maccabi Sha'arayim will return to Giv'atayim in the next year (Page 4) Hadshot HaSport, 3.7.60, archive.football.co.il 

Liga Bet seasons
Israel
3